Michael Hunter (born 27 May 1948) is an English former footballer who played as a forward in the Football League for Darlington and in the League of Ireland for Sligo Rovers. He was on the books of Blackpool without representing them in the League. Hunter joined Sligo Rovers in August 1968, and played for them until at least 1970.

References

1948 births
Living people
Sportspeople from Hexham
English footballers
Association football forwards
Blackpool F.C. players
Darlington F.C. players
Sligo Rovers F.C. players
English Football League players
League of Ireland players
Footballers from Northumberland